Herc's Adventures is a video game released for the PlayStation and the Sega Saturn by LucasArts in 1997. The overhead, action-adventure format is similar to Zombies Ate My Neighbors. Up to two players each take on the role of one of three ancient Greek heroes: Herc (Hercules), Atlanta (Atalanta), or Jason, who are on a quest to defeat Hades and save the goddess of nature, Persephone. In 2014, it was released for PSN in North America.

Herc's Adventures was originally announced as a Sega Saturn exclusive with a release date of December 1996, but delays pushed its release back to July 1997. The PlayStation version was released internationally, while the Saturn version was exclusive to North America. Virgin Interactive had planned to release the Saturn version in Europe in September 1997, but it was dropped from the release schedule as part of Virgin's withdrawal of support for the Saturn.

Gameplay 
The characters pick up various weapons and items, which include: pepper breath against bees and wasps, frost breath that freezes enemies, lightning which blasts a target with electrical energy, spears, boar traps, flaming spears (used against the Hydra to prevent its head from reforming), bombs, an evil Pandora's box which when opened releases rough weather, a shrink doll which miniaturizes any target and a laser gun. Items include Circe's potion which turned the player into a pig to fit into small crevices, Medusa and Minotaur's head, and the golden fleece (which opens the gates of Hades' underworld).

Gyros increase the player's health bar, and each hero has a second strength bar that depletes whenever moving or picking up an object. Health and strength are increased by buying lessons from a strength trainer or finding red hearts.

Every time the players die, they are sent down to the underworld and need to fight their way to the exit in order to continue. The more they die, the further back into the underworld they are sent, making it increasingly harder to fight their way out. Dying five times results in a game over.

With the exception of the switch to and from the underworld section, the game world is presented as an open, singular map, without any loading screens or interstitials between areas.

Voice cast
Rachel Reenstra - Atlanta
Lois Nettleton - Athena
Cástulo Guerra - Hades
Patty Parris - Hera
Michael Gough - Hercules / Dionysus
Tom Wyner - Zeus / Poseidon
Wally Wingert - Jason / Bronze Guy / Big Soldier
Pat Fraley - Minotaur / Helldog / Soldier

Reception

Herc's Adventures met with mostly positive reviews, as critics were overwhelmingly pleased with the graphics, offbeat humor, huge amount of lands to explore, and inclusion of three playable characters, each with their own strengths and weaknesses that make an important difference in how the game plays.

The more mixed reviews found some faults with the gameplay. Next Generation opined that the gameplay is too one-note and that the skewed perspective sometimes creates confusion about where the player character can go, though the reviewer still concluded that the game is fun enough and different enough to be enjoyable. IGN criticized only the fact that the game is not a polygon-based fighting game or racing game, remarking that it was exceptionally good for a game that did not fall into either of those genres. Most critical commentary on the gameplay was positive, however, with several critics commenting that the cooperative two-player mode is especially fun. Shawn Smith of Electronic Gaming Monthly stated that "the gameplay is flawless."

Glenn Rubenstein of GameSpot summed up that "The graphics, gameplay, and humor make a unique mix that results in a truly fresh title unlike most of the other games on the market today." Major Mike gave the Saturn version a perfect 5.0 out of 5 in all four GamePro categories (graphics, sound, control, and funfactor), noting in particular the excellent incorporation of mythological figures. He gave the PlayStation version a 4.5 out of 5 in all four categories, but did not directly compare it to the Saturn version, and Rubenstein gave the two versions identical scores.

References

External links 
 

1997 video games
Action-adventure games
Ancient Greece in fiction
Cooperative video games
Cultural depictions of Jason
Heracles in fiction
LucasArts games
PlayStation (console) games
PlayStation Network games
Sega Saturn games
Video games developed in the United States
Video games scored by Michael Land
Video games set in antiquity
Video games set in Greece
Video games based on Greek mythology